WCTH (100.3 FM) is a radio station broadcasting a country music format. Licensed to Plantation Key, Florida, United States, the station serves the Florida Keys area.  The station is currently owned by Robert Holladay, through licensee Florida Keys Media, LLC, and features programming from Westwood One.

On January 25, 2008, it was announced that WCTH was one of several Clear Channel radio stations to be sold, in order to remain under the ownership caps following the sale of Clear Channel to private investors. Until it was sold, WCTH and other stations to be sold were placed into the Aloha Stations Trust.

The trust sold WCTH and three sister stations to Robert Holladay's Florida Keys Media, LLC for $650,000; the transaction was consummated February 28, 2014.

References

External links

CTH
Country radio stations in the United States
Radio stations established in 1979
1979 establishments in Florida